The Des Plaines crater or Des Plaines disturbance is recognized as an impact crater in Cook County, Illinois, United States. It is located beneath the eastern part of the city of Des Plaines, which is a suburb of Chicago.

The age of the crater is unknown but is thought to be between 280 million years and 2 million years (Permian or younger). The crater is buried beneath 75 to 200 feet (23–60 m) of glacial till and can only be seen as a series of faults and deformations in well logs and seismic surveys. Subsurface strata of Cambrian through Pennsylvanian age has been faulted and tilted by the event. Prior to being recognized as an impact structure, the feature was referred to as a cryptoexplosion structure or cryptovolcanic structure, as were several others in the Midwestern United States. The upfaulted central portion and the presence of shatter cone structures support the impact origin.

References

External links
Aerial Exploration of the Des Plaines Impact Structure

Des Plaines, Illinois
Geology of Illinois
Impact craters of the United States
Landforms of Cook County, Illinois
Permian impact craters